Stanley Warren (1917 England – 20 February 1992, Dorset England) was an English painter. He was a bombardier of the 15th Regiment of the Royal Regiment of Artillery who became known for the Changi Murals he painted at a chapel during his internment in Changi prison in Singapore during World War II.

Early life
He was born in England and was a talented artist from a young age. Warren was educated at Hornsey College of Art.

An artist before the war Warren was employed as a commercial designer producing poster ads with the Grenada organisation.

Changi internment and murals
Warren was interned during the Japanese occupation of Singapore in World War II. His murals were completed under difficult conditions of sickness, limited materials and hardships. With a message of universal love and forgiveness, they helped to uplift the spirits of the POWs and the sick who sought refuge in the prison chapel.

His five murals on the walls of St Luke's Chapel depict the biblical scenes of the Nativity, the Ascension, Crucifixion, Last Supper and Saint Luke in Prison.

Post-war
The murals were discovered in 1958 and a search was made to find the artist. Warren was, by that time, an art teacher at Sir William Collins School, later South Camden Community School and currently Regent High School in Somers Town, north London. Warren had thought that the murals had been destroyed, but was shown a photograph of one of his murals in the Daily Mirror by a colleague at Barnsbury Central  school, where he was the Art Teacher in 1957.

He was brought out to Singapore and restored the murals on several trips there.

References

External links
Changi Murals

World War II prisoners of war held by Japan
Royal Artillery soldiers
British Army personnel of World War II
1917 births
1992 deaths
English muralists
20th-century English painters
English male painters
20th-century English male artists